Christelle Fernandez-Schulte (born 2 February 1974) is a French rower. She competed in the women's lightweight double sculls event at the 2000 Summer Olympics.

References

External links
 

1974 births
Living people
French female rowers
Olympic rowers of France
Rowers at the 2000 Summer Olympics
Sportspeople from Besançon